David Sears II (October 8, 1787 – January 14, 1871) was a prominent 19th-century Boston philanthropist, merchant, real estate developer, and landowner.

Biography
David Sears II was born on October 8, 1787, in Boston. He was a descendant of Richard Sears, who settled in the Plymouth Colony in 1630. His mother was Ann Winthrop, a direct descendant of the first governor of Massachusetts, John Winthrop. He graduated from Harvard College in 1807, where he was a member of the Porcellian Club. Upon the death of his father, David Sears, in 1816, he inherited a large fortune, the result of a career in the China trade. In 1809, he married Miriam Clarke Mason (1789–1870), daughter of U.S. Representative and Senator Jonathan Mason. They had nine children, one of whom was called David Sears Jr.

Gilbert Stuart painted his portrait twice and one of those, painted about 1815 and entirely in Stuart's hand, is in the collections of the Metropolitan Museum of Art.

He helped fund the construction and decoration of St. Paul's Cathedral on Boston Common in 1819.

He donated a large telescope that served as the central feature of the Harvard Astrononimical Observatory at its founding in 1843.

He also built Christ's Church Longwood there, in the crypt of which he and many of his family members are buried. He established it as an ecumenical house of worship to promote Christian unity, in accordance with his personal beliefs, which have been termed "outspoken and peculiar". He also purchased a large tract to the north of Longwood, where he built a house for his son Frederick in 1844. Sears sold the area in 1850 and the purchasers developed Cottage Farm, another historic district.

In 1844 his gift of $10,000 rescued Amherst College during a difficult time and marks the beginning of the Sears Foundation of Literature and Benevolence.

Sears spent summers at a vacation home in Maine where local residents, in the hope of attracting his patronage, named a new municipality Searsport in his honor. He donated $1000 for the construction of a town hall, denounced the design of the one they built, and made no further donations.

For about fifteen years beginning in 1849, he promoted a plan for the development of Boston's Back Bay neighborhood that would increase the value of his real estate investments at the expense of the state government. As it evolved before its final rejection, his proposal included a large lake or a long narrow channel as well as seven block-sized parks.

In 1819, he had a house designed by Alexander Parris and built on Beacon Hill at 42–43 Beacon Street that is believed to be the first granite structure in Boston and the finest residence of his day. He doubled its size in 1831. Sears was enamored of Napoleon Bonaparte, naming several of his properties "Longwood" for the French emperor's last home on St. Helena, and his Beacon Street home paid tribute in adopting the empire style for its decor with a liberal use of golden eagles and the initial "N". It was purchased by the Somerset Club in 1871.

David Sears died at his Beacon Street home on January 14, 1871.

Sears Island and Searsport, Maine, are named for him.

His great-great-grandson was John W. Sears, a Republican politician active in the 1960s and 1970s. He was not related to Richard Warren Sears, who along with Alvah Curtis Roebuck founded the well-known department store chain and catalog Sears, Roebuck, & Co.

See also
 Sears Tower – Harvard Observatory
 Searsport, Maine
 Somerset Club

Notes

References

Additional sources

External links
 Longwood and Cottage Farm, Brookline, Massachusetts
 Longwood Mall, a National Historic Site
 David Sears House/Somerset Club

Businesspeople from Boston
1787 births
1871 deaths
19th century in Boston
People from Beacon Hill, Boston
Harvard College alumni
19th-century American businesspeople